Reginald Herbert Lockwood (30 October 1912 – 24 April 1996), known professionally as Preston Lockwood, was an English radio and television actor.

The only son of bus driver Herbert Lewis Lockwood and his wife Ethel May (née Preston), Lockwood was born in Essex; he had two elder sisters, Sylvia (born 1908) and Phyllis (born 1909). He used his mother's maiden name as his stage name.

His television credits include the role of Butterfield the butler in several episodes of Jeeves and Wooster. He also appeared in the first episode of The Vicar of Dibley as Reverend Pottle, whose death midway through the service served as the catalyst for Geraldine Granger's (Dawn French) arrival.

Other appearances include  
Other appearances include  The Ash Tree, Poldark, Shoestring, Doctor Who, Keeping Up Appearances, Tenko, Miss Marple, All Creatures Great and Small and Inspector Morse.

His performances on BBC Radio include Dennis the Dachshund in Children's Hour's Toytown.

One of his final roles was as Coriakin the magician in the 1989 BBC TV adaptation of The Voyage of the Dawn Treader, one of Chronicles of Narnia.

Filmography

References

External links
 
 Obituary in The Independent

1912 births
1996 deaths
English male television actors
English male radio actors
Male actors from London
20th-century English male actors